Kenneth Iverson may refer to:
 Kenneth E. Iverson (1920–2004), developer of the APL programming language
 F. Kenneth Iverson (1925–2002), former CEO of the Nucor Corporation